The Orašac Assembly was the gathering of 300 Serbian chiefs and rebels on  (Presentation of Jesus at the Temple) at Orašac, a village near Aranđelovac, following the "Slaughter of the Knezes" which saw 70 notable Serbs murdered by the renegade Janissaries (the Dahije) in January which prompted the Serbs to rise up against the tyranny (known in historiography as the "Uprising against the Dahije"), resulting in the First Serbian Uprising against the Ottoman Empire. Karađorđe was appointed leader of the Serbian rebels after they all raised their "three fingers in the air" and thereby swore oath. The site of the assembly, Marićevića jaruga, is today a memorial complex.

Background 
In the Belgrade pashalik, until the beginning of the uprising and after, there were the usual princely assemblies. It was also an institution of local autonomy, which was practiced in several places during the Turkish rule in our region. especially at the ends of individual mountain systems. Even the hatisherif that Porta gave to the Serbs in the Belgrade pashalik after Kočina Frontier Rebellion contained certain characteristics of an autonomous organization. The people's elders of one principality participated in the work of assembling all other principalities when the uprising broke out.

The first thing they did, concluding to start an uprising, Karađorđe, and his comrades-at-arms convened to one meeting, to the "people's assembly" (that name is preserved in all memoirs of that time, and is also used in official insurgent correspondence) more prominent people from Kragujevac and Belgrade.

Insurgent Assembly in Orašac 
In the famous town of Orašac, the Orašac Assembly took place, at which the people's leaders from the Belgrade and Kragujevac districts decided to start an uprising and elected Karađorđe as the insurgent leader, it was not an ordinary assembly, first because it was secretive, so only the closest circle of selected people knew about it, and second because it was insurgent. conspiratorial, and that it aimed to carry out two important conclusions of an earlier, even narrower gathering of national leaders, held in Orašac on 8 November 1803: to conclude the rise of the people's uprising in the Belgrade pashalik and elect an insurgent leader. It was, in fact, a gathering of revolutionary people's princes and other champions and elders, mixed with the faces of the priesthood on the one hand, and hajduk elders on the other, held in a hard-to-reach and hidden place, at dawn. The immediate reason for its maintenance, as well as for the uprising itself, was the slaughter of princes and national leaders by the Dahijas, and the difficult situation that ruled the country under the system of the Dahiya administration.

On 2 February 1804, at Sretenje, early in the morning, strong guards were set up around the place where the assembly would be held. Participants who arrived the day before or during the night from various directions in Orašac gathered several Marićević Jaruga, near two large elms, on a plateau surrounded on all sides by a dense meadow. Karađorđe, who was the main organizer of this insurgent assembly, presented the position of the Belgrade pashalik since it has been under the Dahija administration and stated the goal of this meeting. Of all the princes, champions, and prominent men of the Hajduk brotherhood, as many, as there were at this assembly, there was no one who would be against the uprising. When the question of leadership was raised, the same unanimity was shown: although Karađorđe nominated some capable and respectable persons, such as Stanoje Glavaš, Vule Ilić Kolarac, Prince Marko Savić, and Teodosije Maričević, both Glavaš and Kolarac and the other proposed persons all rejected their respective candidacy, so Karađorđe was elected the leader of the uprising, however, the supreme leader, who received the election only after a long resistance and when it was repeated to him several times that the people wanted to be led in the uprising by people of Karađorđe's personal characteristics.

When Karađorđe accepted the election, Archpriest Atanasije Antonijević of Bukovik put on an epitaph, lit a candle, blessed the election, and the people's conclusions, and swore allegiance to the Leader and the uprising. The chosen Leader kissed everyone present. After that day, the uprising began immediately, so that on 4 February 1804, the Austrian border authorities knew for sure that the uprising was flaring up in neighboring Serbia and that "Christian Serbs had taken up arms." [3] [4]

Assembly participants
The cross with which Atanasije Antonijević blessed Karađorđe's insurgents.

Historian Milenko Vukićević maintains that about 300 people were present at the Orašac insurgent assembly. Today, based on historical and memoir literature, only the presence of these people can be determined: Protojerej Atanasije Antonijević, Stanoje Glavaš, Hajduk-Veljko Petrović, Vule Ilić Kolarac, Milisav Lipovac, Djordjic of Visevac, Jovan Krstović of Bukovik, Aleksa Dukić, Arsenije Loma, Tanasko Rajić, Janićije Đurić, Prince of Orašac Marko Savić, merchant Teodosije Maričević, Aleksa Jakovljević, Prince Vićentije Petrović of Koraćica, Prince Matija Jovićić of Topola, Mihailo Badžak of Jagnjilo, Matija Karatošić of Kopljar, Milutin Savić, Marko Petar Dugonjić of Masloševo, Blagoje and Gliša (no surname given) both of Masloševo, Ćira Prokić and Miloje Čekerević (Masloševo), Stevan Rajaković, Mata Milivojević, Mandić and Milovan Đurić (Stragari), Andreja Jokić, Rista Đurđezić, Mihailo Manojlović, Paun Čolkć, Matija Milošević, Lazar Milosavljević, Dimitrije Perić, Dimitrije Manojlović, Gavrilo Đurić, Grigorije Marković (all came from Topola), Đordje Dukić, Tanasije Dukić, Jovan Riznić, Sreten, Teofan and Jakov Tomkovići (Ba) also, Gaja Ostojić of Orašac, Petar Kara (Trešnjevica), Hajduk Mileta (Glibovac), Hajduk Kara Steva of Provo, Hajduk Milovan (Plana), Dimitrije Radović (Vrbica), Milovan Đurković (Jagnjilo), Miloš Arsenijević (Dravlje), Janko Račanin (Rača), Nikodije Dobrić (Ovsište), Marko Milosavljević (Kopljare), Nikola Leka (Lipovac), Milovan Garašanin (Lipovac), Radovan Garašanin (Lipovac), Sima Serdar (Darosava), Toma Starčević  (Orašac), Jovan Bulatović (Orašac) and Vasa Saramanda (Bukovik).

Consequences 
True, everything was done in one quick, short, insurgent and revolutionary procedure, but the mutual oath was there, it acted in a certain and strong way, so blood and fire, those two symbols of revolutionary mass movements, soon gave real meaning to the Orašac decisions. In a relatively short time, the Belgrade pashalik was cleansed of Turks. The power, according to the law, was in the hands of the sultan, but in fact, it was in the hands of Karađorđe and the insurgents. All negotiations conducted with anyone and in any form, after that time, were conducted in the name of the people; all letters, complaints or petitions were carried, except for the signature of Karađorđe as the "Supreme Leader of the Serbian People", later the Leader, and the signatures of other people's elders, mostly those who appear as regular participants in all people's assemblies.

See also
 Serbian Revolution
 First Serbian Uprising
 Meeting of the Lord
 Serbian Independence Day
 Timeline of the Serbian Revolution

References

Literature
 Djordjević, Miroslav R. (1979): "Serbia in Uprising: 1804-1813".
 Jelavich, Charles; Jelavich, Barbara (1986): "The Establishment of the Balkan National States, 1804-1920". University of Washington Press. ISBN 978-0-295-96413-3.

Sources

1800s in Serbia
1804 in the Ottoman Empire
First Serbian Uprising
Aranđelovac
1804 elections in Europe
1804 in military history
1804 conferences
Ottoman Serbia